Javier Sebastián Robles (born January 18, 1985 in Buenos Aires) is an Argentine footballer currently playing for Comerciantes Unidos in the Peruvian Segunda División.

Career
Robles spent the majority of his early career in South America, playing for  Vélez Sársfield and Club Olimpo in his native Argentina, and for Santiago Wanderers in Chile.

San Jose Earthquakes
On March 1, 2010, the San Jose Earthquakes officially announced the signing of Robles after he trialed with the club in the offseason. He was released by the club on August 2, 2010.

Iraklis
On January 7, 2011 Robles signed a contract with Greek club Iraklis until the summer of 2012. He debuted for Iraklis on 23 January 2011, as he came in for Carlinhos as a half-time substitute in a 3-0 away defeat by AO Kavala.

References

External links
 
 

1985 births
Living people
Argentine footballers
Argentine expatriate footballers
Club Atlético Vélez Sarsfield footballers
Santiago Wanderers footballers
Olimpo footballers
San Jose Earthquakes players
Iraklis Thessaloniki F.C. players
C.D. Cuenca footballers
Club Almirante Brown footballers
Gimnasia y Esgrima de Concepción del Uruguay footballers
Sarmiento de Resistencia footballers
Club San José players
Universidad Técnica de Cajamarca footballers
Juan Aurich footballers
Comerciantes Unidos footballers
Super League Greece players
Major League Soccer players
Chilean Primera División players
Argentine Primera División players
Primera Nacional players
Torneo Federal A players
Ecuadorian Serie A players
Bolivian Primera División players
Peruvian Primera División players
Peruvian Segunda División players
Argentine expatriate sportspeople in Chile
Argentine expatriate sportspeople in Greece
Argentine expatriate sportspeople in Ecuador
Argentine expatriate sportspeople in the United States
Argentine expatriate sportspeople in Bolivia
Argentine expatriate sportspeople in Peru
Expatriate footballers in Chile
Expatriate footballers in Greece
Expatriate footballers in Ecuador
Expatriate soccer players in the United States
Expatriate footballers in Bolivia
Expatriate footballers in Peru
Association football midfielders
Footballers from Buenos Aires